Sela pri Štravberku is a small settlement in the hills north of Novo Mesto in southeastern Slovenia. The area is part of the traditional region of Lower Carniola and is now included in the Southeast Slovenia Statistical Region.

Name
The name of the settlement was changed from Sela to Sela pri Štravberku in 1952.

Cultural heritage
In 2006, a Bronze Age settlement was found in the area.

References

External links
Sela pri Štravberku on Geopedia

Populated places in the City Municipality of Novo Mesto